Resident Evil Outbreak is a survival horror video game with online playability for the PlayStation 2. Initially released in 2003, it was developed by Capcom Production Studio 1 and was the first entry in the Resident Evil video game series to feature cooperative gameplay and online multiplayer support, although online support was not available for the PAL versions of the game.

Outbreak depicts a series of episodic storylines in a zombie-inhabited Raccoon City. Players control eight characters with unique abilities. It was set during the same general time period as Resident Evil 2 and 3. Outbreak was followed by a standalone expansion entitled Resident Evil Outbreak: File #2. The game was praised for the graphics, fun-factor, and multiplayer but criticized for the lack of voice chat.

Gameplay

The controls and gameplay are similar to the Resident Evil remake, which was exclusive to the Nintendo GameCube, with quite a few adjustments. The player chooses a scenario, difficulty level, and character selection screen. The difficulty level is tied to what enemies and items the player encounters while progressing through the scenario. The game has five scenarios, each of which has an event checklist consisting of special actions that the player must perform to reach 100% completion. Upon doing so the player will unlock "Infinity Mode", in which all the player's weapons never break or run out of ammunition.

Each scenario also has "SP" items. These are invisible items hidden throughout the level and are randomly generated on two paths. There are 20 scenario items for each scenario, and twenty items specific to each character hidden across the five scenarios. If acquired, these items unlock new costumes and the option to listen to their ad-libs.

Players were able to connect to the internet servers using a broadband connection and a network adapter. Account registration and login were required. Once players connected and logged in, they would choose between Free Mode and Scenario Mode. Free Mode took place in a lobby and allowed players to create their own games, scenarios, and difficulty level. Scenario Mode would choose the scenario and players automatically. When a player first started online, the game would begin on the "Outbreak" scenario and progress from there. If players wished to stop playing, they could save their data and restart from the scenario they were up to at the time. If players had beaten a scenario, they acquired a star next to their names.

Capcom shut down the American servers for Outbreak on December 31, 2007, and the Japanese servers on June 30, 2011, ending official online capabilities.

Plot
The beginning of Outbreak is set a couple of days after the initial outbreak of the T-virus in Raccoon City, moments before the crisis further escalates into complete chaos. The game starts with the eight characters in J's Bar, who are unaware of what is happening until a lone zombie wanders into the bar and attacks one of the employees named Will. After that, the characters must make it through the city. The game ends in the final moments of the same incident, with the player attempting to escape Raccoon City before the U.S. government launches a missile strike to eliminate the threat posed by the G-virus. The player controls one of eight characters with gameplay events transpiring across various regions of Raccoon City and span over a period of several days.

Playable characters 

 Kevin Ryman (voiced by Kirk Thornton) - A member of the Raccoon City Police Department. Kevin applied for the Special Tactics and Rescue Service (S.T.A.R.S.) but failed because of his carefree attitude. He is an accomplished marksman. Kevin was a regular at Jack's Bar and was there when the outbreak began. He has a "pot shot" ability that allows him to perform more general bullet damage than anyone else and is an all rounder who begins with his own weapon.
 David King (voiced by Bob Papenbrook) - A handyman at Raccoon City, who's able to create weapons using his tools. He was drinking at Jack's Bar before the outbreak begins. His age was unknown. He can fix weapons or create new ones if the player finds material.
 Mark Wilkins (voiced by Beau Billingslea) - A veteran of the Vietnam War. He settled down in Raccoon City with his wife and son. At the time of the Outbreak, Mark was employed as a security guard. He was eating at Jack's Bar with a co-worker when the story begins. He has the most HP out of the starting cast, not counting secret unlockables, but he can't hide in certain places team mates could.
 Alyssa Ashcroft (voiced by Wendee Lee) - An investigative reporter in Raccoon City. She had her memory suppressed by an Umbrella Researcher to cover-up an incident in the Arklay Mountains. She can pick locks and access areas team mates can't and has a weaker version of Kevin's pot shot ability.
 Cindy Lennox (voiced by Julie Maddalena) - A waitress at Jack's Bar. She was in Jack's Bar when the infected attacked. She can hold more herbs than any of her allies and even begins with a usable supply but her other stats are below average and she has the second lowest HP of the starting cast.
 Yoko Suzuki (voiced by Laura Thorne) - A university student and former Umbrella Corporation employee. Her memories were suppressed about her time at Umbrella when she became a burden to them. She has the unique backpack ability that allows her to hold 8 overall items compared to everyone else's 4 general items though her other stats are among the lowest in the game and she also has the lowest HP the starting cast.
 Jim Chapman (voiced by Karim Morgan) - A subway staffer that is easily scared. He has a unique "luck" mechanic and could play dead but he has the fastest infection growth rate of all the starting cast.
 George Hamilton (voiced by Bob Buchholz) - A surgeon at Raccoon General Hospital. He can create medicine from herbs and other supplies provided the player has the proper ingredients

There are five individual scenarios in this game, which are not set in chronological order. The first, "Outbreak", takes place at the beginning of the outbreak, as the police prepare to destroy the zombie horde using explosives. "Below Freezing Point" deals with the events in the former underground laboratory of Umbrella, where a rogue virologist, Monica, attempts to steal bio-weapons research and deal with her former co-worker, Yoko Suzuki. "The Hive" involves the survivors taking refuge in the Raccoon General Hospital, which is also featured in Resident Evil 3: Nemesis, while it is under assault from a colony of infected leeches. "Hellfire", set the same day as "Outbreak", involves a group of survivors fleeing into the Apple Inn hotel that turns out to be on fire and swarming with lickers. The final scenario, "Decisions, Decisions", regards the survivors' search for a cure to the T-virus, which sends them to Raccoon City University, where the eight different characters must wisely choose a decision to survive the puzzling secrets hidden in the university; they must then escape the city before it is destroyed.

Development

Initial planning and cancellation
According to an interview with producer Noritaka Funamizu, the first concept of Biohazard Outbreak, as it was known originally, was known before the release of Resident Evil 2 in 1998. With growing interest in the concept of network gaming over consoles, Shinji Mikami, the director of the first Resident Evil, suggested to Funamizu that he should have a try. Early on in the design, Funamizu made a small multi-player mini-game in which the player must survive the longest time possible; the team decided to remove it due to its failure to encourage teamwork—players would instinctively run away from the horde and be slaughtered rather than help one another to ensure their own survival. They decided that what made Resident Evil scary was its lack of multiplayer, forcing gamers to play "on their own". The team then chose that the game would follow its own story like the other games in the series, but keep the option for multi-player. The game development was later put on hold. 

Capcom announced on March 31st 2007 that they were shutting down the online servers.

Revival
Prior to 2002, Capcom decided to revive development of the game, based on the research gathered from the first attempt. Production Studio 1 began its development of the game, as opposed to Mikami's Studio 4. In February 2002, a Sony press conference regarding the PlayStation 2 revealed the game—previously unheard-of by the public, it had a working title of Biohazard Online. This led to confusion amongst the audience before Capcom released a statement confirming its existence. Resident Evil Outbreak was a part of an initiative from Capcom's Production Studio 1 to develop three network focused games on the PlayStation 2. The other games were Auto Modellista and Monster Hunter. Capcom's goal was to have at least one of the games reach a million sales. Both Monster Hunter and Resident Evil Outbreak eventually reached this goal.

The game made an appearance at Sony's conference on May 21 at E3 2002, with a video showcasing real-time 3D backgrounds (as opposed to pre-rendered); revealing four of the characters and demonstrating the ad-lib system and character communication. The "ad-lib system" was chosen over conventional microphone chat because the development team argued that it would ruin the atmosphere. Instead, limited chat options were used for conversation between users; a player would walk up to another and deliver a line from a particular conversational category (e.g. "help" and "go" categories). No solid release date was given at that time.

Later that year the game was renamed Biohazard Network. By October, eighteen different scenarios were in development, with even more in the concept phase. In November, Capcom released various pieces of media, showing eight playable characters and familiar-scenarios such as "Flashback". The occupations of the characters were also given.

In January 2003, further information was provided, mostly regarding interactive NPCs (non-player characters). Capcom boasted such actions as enemy NPCs who would attack the player and other ones that would run away when approached. Screenshots of "Flashback", "Underbelly", "The Hive" and other scenarios were released.

By May 2003, the game's title had been changed. This time, it had been changed to Biohazard Outbreak (Resident Evil Outbreak outside Japan), and the number of scenarios was reduced to the five scenarios. Another five scenarios did not make the initial cut, although they were complete enough to be featured in the E3 2002 trailer, and were developed into the sequel Resident Evil Outbreak File #2. In September, doubts were raised as to Outbreaks online game-play in Europe, but Capcom was adamant that it would at least try to find a way to solve the problem in time for release.

Release

The European release was heavily delayed, finally released in September 2004—nine months after Japan and the United States saw its release. Back in March Capcom had given in on securing Outbreaks network due to the numerous problems faced with establishing a network in a region simultaneously for dozens of languages, and securing service providers; as well as the usual PAL/NTSC differential.

Reception 

Outbreak received a "C+" from 1UP.com in their review. The staff referred to it as "another typical entry in the RE canon", and as a "competent game" with "controls [that] are actually functional and somewhat intuitive". However, they cited a number of problems with the game, notably Capcom's choice of not installing voice chat in favor of the ad-lib system. They found the game's five scenarios to be short, and AI partners to be "chock-full of repetitive and annoying sound bytes".

Eurogamer was disappointed with Capcom's failure to establish online support for the European market at a time when the PlayStation 2's online community was threatened with the expected rise in the Xbox's popularity with the upcoming release of Halo 2, stating that an Outbreak was "designed from the ground up to be a co-operative multiplayer game for four players" and questioning if a network-less game would be of interest to players. Another problem was with the real-time "START" menu, which meant that file-reading and item-trading would make the player vulnerable to a random zombie attack, making the game "[feel] light in the story department" as a consequence of not becoming immersed in the environment. Long load times for the PAL version was also noted in the review.

By August 2006, Outbreak had sold 1.45 million copies.

Notes

References

External links
 

2003 video games
Cooperative video games
Interquel video games
Multiplayer and single-player video games
PlayStation 2 games
PlayStation 2-only games
Survival video games
Video game prequels
Video games about police officers
Video games developed in Japan
Video games featuring female protagonists
Video games scored by Tetsuya Shibata
Video games set in the United States
Video games set in 1998
Video games with pre-rendered 3D graphics
Resident Evil spin-off games
2000s horror video games